Chequerbent railway station was a railway station in Westhoughton to the south-west of Bolton, Greater Manchester, on the line between Bolton and Leigh. It was open from 1831 until its replacement in 1885 by a later station.

History
The Bolton and Leigh Railway (B&LR) opened for goods traffic in 1828, followed by passenger services in 1831.

The railway was built as a single track line and the route included two inclines which were worked using ropes hauled by stationary engines, locomotive haulage being used on the flatter sections of the line. One of these inclines was situated north of Atherton Bag Lane railway station with the line climbing up through Chequerbent before dropping towards Bolton. This incline was operated by a  stationary steam engine.

The station at Chequerbent opened on 11 June 1831. The station was sited south of the Turnpike road (now the A6) near to the engine winding house. The station site was not marked on contemporary maps but the engine house is clearly marked on the OS six-inch map surveyed in 1845. The station has been described as a convenient "halt" for the Hulton Family, as William Hulton was an early promoter and supporter of the railway.

To avoid these inclines, and allow steam locomotives to haul trains for the entire journey, the London and North Western Railway (LNWR), successor to the B&LR, built deviations over easier gradients. This required the resiting of several stations, including Chequerbent.

The station closed on 2 February 1885 and was replaced by a new Chequerbent only a short distance away on the same day.

References

External links
Site of Chequerbent Station on navigable 1948 O.S. map
Chequerbent Station at Disused Stations Site Record

Disused railway stations in the Metropolitan Borough of Bolton
Former London and North Western Railway stations
Railway stations in Great Britain opened in 1831
Railway stations in Great Britain closed in 1885
Demolished buildings and structures in Greater Manchester